Mark Urvanov (born 12 May 1996) is a Russian professional boxer, who held the WBO International super featherweight title in 2019.

Professional boxing career
Urvanov made his professional debut against Mikhail Alexeev on 24 April 2015. He lost the fight by unanimous decision. Urvanov amassed a 5–1 during the rest of the year, with three of those victories coming by way of stoppage. Urvanov won his first professional title, the Russian featherweight belt, with a ten-round unanimous decision of Alexey Shorokhov.

Urvanov won his next six fights, before being booked to face Muhammadkhuja Yaqubov for the vacant WBA Continental and IBF Baltic super featherweight titles on 10 February 2018. Yaqubov won the fight by unanimous decision. The judges scored the fight 117–110 for him, while the third judge scored it 116–111 in his favor.

Following the second loss of his professional career, Urvanov faced the jorneyman Feruz Yuldoshev on 4 May 2018. He won the fight by unanimous decision, with scores of 77–75, 78–74 and 78–74. Urvanov was then booked to face Nikita Kuznetsov for the vacant WBC CISBB, IBF Youth and EBP super featherweight titles. The fight ended in a split draw.

Urvanov faced Jovylito Aligarbes on 10 November 2018. He won the fight by a third-round knockout. After a quick second-round technical knockout of the over-matched Pfariso Neluvhulani on 23 March 2019, Urvanov was booked to face Marco Demecillo on 13 July 2019. He won the fight by unanimous decision, with scores of 78–73, 78–73 and 77–74.

Urvanov was booked to face Evgeny Chuprakov for the vacant WBO International super featherweight title on 2 November 2019. He won the fight by a third-round technical knockout. Four months later, on 7 March 2020, Urvanov challenged the unbeaten WBA Gold super featherweight champion Akzhol Sulaimanbek Uulu. He won the fight by a seventh-round knockout.

Urvanov faced the journeyman Rofhiwa Maemu on 26 June 2021. He won the fight by unanimous decision, with all three judges scoring the fight 80–72 in his favor. Urvanov next faced the undefeated Oto Joseph on 11 September 2021. He won the fight by unanimous decision, with all three judges scoring the fight 100–90 in his favor.

Urvanov was booked to face Angel Rodriguez on 19 February 2022, on the undercard of the Zaur Abdullaev and Jorge Linares lightweight bout, in a WBA super featherweight title eliminator. He lost the fight by split decision. One judge scored the fight 115–113 in his favor, while the remaining two judges scored the bout 116–112 and 115–113 for Rodriguez.

Following his loss to Rodriguez, Urvanov was booked to face Dmitrii Khasiev on 23 July 2022. He won the fight by unanimous decision. Urvanov then faced the former super featherweight world titleholder René Alvarado on 19 November 2022. He won the fight by unanimous decision.

Urvanov faced the once-defeated Ruslan Kamilov on 7 March 2023. He won the fight by majority decision, with two judges scoring the bout 97–93 and 96–94 in his favor, while the third judge had it scored as an even 95–95 draw.

Professional boxing record

References

Living people
1996 births
Russian male boxers
Sportspeople from Yekaterinburg
Featherweight boxers
Super-featherweight boxers